Caroline Vanderbeken (born 1950) is a Belgian chess player, Belgian Women's Chess Championship winner (1970).

Biography
From the mid-1960s to the begin of 1970s, Caroline Vanderbeken was one of the leading chess players in the Belgium. She won the Belgian Women's Chess Championships in 1970 after play-off match won against Louise Loeffler: 1½:½. Caroline Vanderbeken participated in traditional Belgium team matches against France in 1969, 1970 and 1971.

Caroline Vanderbeken played for Belgium in the Women's Chess Olympiad:
 In 1969, at first board in the 4th Chess Olympiad (women) in Lublin (+1, =2, -11).

References

1950 births
Living people
Belgian chess players
Chess Olympiad competitors
20th-century chess players